Fraser Nunatak is a nunatak rising to ,  south west of the Wilhoite Nunataks and west of the Churchill Mountains in Antarctica. It was named in honor of Graham Fraser, who has had some 45 years of Antarctic experience and led geomagnetic pulsation research over 11 seasons from 1989 onwards.

References

Nunataks of Oates Land